A Revision is a Canadian drama film, directed by Catherine Therrien and released in 2021. The film stars Patrice Robitaille as Étienne Brasseur, a philosophy professor who undergoes a crisis of faith after interacting with Nacira Abdeli (Nour Belkhiria), a Muslim student who debates and challenges his values.

The film's cast also includes Rabah Aït Ouyahia, Pierre Curzi, Vincent Bellefleur, Anne-Élisabeth Bossé, Édith Cochrane, Isabelle Giroux, Michel Laperrière, Rose-Marie Perreault and Joe Rohayem.

The film premiered at the Angoulême Film Festival in August 2021, and had its Canadian premiere on November 2, 2021, as the opening film of the Cinemania film festival.

Awards

References

External links 
 
 Une révision at Library and Archives Canada

2021 films
2021 drama films
Canadian drama films
Quebec films
French-language Canadian films
2020s Canadian films